Millennium Management is an investment management firm with a multistrategy hedge fund offering. It is one of the world's largest alternative asset management firms with over $50 billion assets under management. The firm operates in America, Europe and Asia.

History 
Israel A. Englander and Ronald Shear, an acquaintance from the American Stock Exchange (AMEX), founded the firm in 1989 with $35 million. The initial $35 million consisted of $5 million from Englander and "$2 million from the Belzberg brothers, wealthy Canadian financiers." Millennium Management initially underperformed and co-founder Ronald Shear left the firm six months after founding it.

In the spring of 2018, Millennium launched a joint venture with WorldQuant, a quantitative investment management firm. 

In 2019 London-based investment firm LCH Investment ranked Millennium Management 12th on their ranking of most successful hedge funds of all time reporting that since its founding in 1989 the firm had made $22.4 billion for its investors, an average of 14% annually since inception. In 2019 the company raised $4.1 billion after a two-year hiatus from raising new capital. The company expects to have raised $7.1 billion by March 2020 and manages a total of nearly $50 billion in capital. The company ended the year 2020 with 265 portfolio manager teams, the most in its history. As of February 2020 Millennium managed over 2,000 data sets from close to 400 providers, for a total of about 10 trillion records of data and over 2,000 terabytes of compressed stored data.

Company

Employees
Israel Englander
(see main article Israel Englander)

Israel Englander is the co-CEO and founder of Millennium Management. He began trading stocks while still in high school, and founded his first company in 1977, I.A. Englander & Company, which is still trading stocks and bonds.

Bobby Jain - In 2016, Millennium Management hired Bobby Jain to join Israel Englander as co-CIO. He was then global head of Credit Suisse Asset Management, the money management arm of Credit Suisse.

Investment team structure 
The company has a platform model of investing made up of approximately 280 investment teams with each portfolio manager allocated money "to deploy in a variety of trading strategies."

Locations 
The company has regional offices in Bengaluru, Mumbai, London, Singapore, Hong Kong, Tokyo, Greenwich and Geneva, with its principal office in New York, in addition to operating smaller offices in locations around the world.

References

Hedge fund firms of the United States
Hedge fund firms in New York City
Financial services companies established in 1989
1989 establishments in Connecticut
Hedge funds
Privately held companies of the United States
Investment companies based in New York City